Dandy is an unincorporated community in York County, Virginia.

History
A post office called Dandy was established in 1906, and remained in operation until 1934. The origin of the name "Dandy" is obscure.

References

Unincorporated communities in York County, Virginia
Unincorporated communities in Virginia